Davide Perino (born 21 July 1981) is an Italian voice actor, the most representative of the sixth generation of dubbing. He is the official Italian dub-over artist of Elijah Wood and Jesse Eisenberg.

Biography
Born in Rome, Perino began his career as a child actor at only two and a half years of age, appearing in the film Magic Moments.

As a voice actor, Perino is best known for having lent his voice to the role of Wood's Frodo Baggins role in The Lord of the Rings trilogy, Cody Kasch in the role of Zach Young on Desperate Housewives, Kristopher Turner in the role of Jamie Andrews in the series Instant Star, Colin Morgan in Merlin, Ryan Corr in the second season of Blue Water High, where he played Eric Tanner, Aaron Ashmore as Jimmy Olsen in Smallville and Chace Crawford in the role of Nate Archibald in Gossip Girl. He also lent his voice to Lucas Grabeel in the role of Ryan Evans in all the High School Musical films as well as Zachary Garred in the show Foreign Exchange.

Perino has voice dubbing jobs in Rome, but rarely does voice jobs in Milan. For example, He has dubbed Sasori in Naruto Shippuden, Harry Osborne in Spectacular Spider-Man and Cody in the Total Drama series. For films he also does Walter in The Muppets and Sam Witwicky in live-action Transformers trilogy.

For video games, Perino has performed Spyro's Italian voice throughout The Legend of Spyro Trilogy. (The original English voice was done by Elijah Wood throughout the trilogy)

Personal life
Perino is the older brother of voice actress Elena Perino. He is also the son of former voice actress Silvia Bellini and the grandson of voice actor Gianfranco Bellini.

Dubbing roles

Animation 
 Sasori in Naruto Shippuden
 Edgar in Once Upon a Forest
 Chester McBadbat in The Fairly OddParents
 Tombo in Kiki's Delivery Service
 Spider-Man in Ultimate Spider-Man
 Harry Osborne in Spectacular Spider-Man
 Walter in The Muppets
 Walter in Muppets Most Wanted
 Sonic the Hedgehog in Sonic the Hedgehog
 Tino Tonitini in The Weekenders
 Cleveland Brown Jr. in The Cleveland Show
 Cleveland Brown Jr. in Family Guy
 Donatello in TMNT
 Lionel Griff in Stanley
 Eze in The Wild
 Toughwood in Valiant
 Jonathan in Hotel Transylvania
 Jonathan in Hotel Transylvania 2
 Jonathan in Hotel Transylvania 3: Summer Vacation
 Wasabi in Big Hero 6
 Flounder in The Little Mermaid II: Return to the Sea
 Tintin The Adventures of Tintin
 Josh Mankey in Kim Possible
 Cody in Total Drama
 Chiro Takashi in Super Robot Monkey Team Hyperforce Go!
 Shelton Klutzberry in The Replacements
 Baby Sylvester in Baby Looney Tunes
 Alvin Seville in ALVINNN!!! and the Chipmunks
 Reggie Bullnerd in ChalkZone

Live action 
 Sam Witwicky in Transformers
 Sam Witwicky in Transformers: Revenge of the Fallen
 Sam Witwicky in Transformers: Dark of the Moon
 Frodo Baggins in The Lord of the Rings: The Fellowship of the Ring
 Frodo Baggins in The Lord of the Rings: The Two Towers
 Frodo Baggins in The Lord of the Rings: The Return of the King
 Alex Summers / Havok in X-Men: First Class
 Alex Summers / Havok in X-Men: Days of Future Past
 Alex Summers / Havok in X-Men: Apocalypse
 Ryan Evans in High School Musical
 Ryan Evans in High School Musical 2
 Ryan Evans in High School Musical 3: Senior Year
 Dave Lizewski / Kick-Ass in Kick-Ass
 Dave Lizewski / Kick-Ass in Kick-Ass 2
 Alvin Seville in Alvin and the Chipmunks
 Alvin Seville in Alvin and the Chipmunks: The Squeakquel
 Pavel Chekov in Star Trek Pavel Chekov in Star Trek Into Darkness Pavel Chekov in Star Trek Beyond Boyd "Bibbia" Swan in Fury Willard Young in Paradise Nat Cooper in Forever Young Mark Evans in The Good Son Leo Beiderman in Deep Impact Casey Connor in The Faculty Patrick in Eternal Sunshine of the Spotless Mind William in Bobby Loras Tyrell in Game of Thrones Mark Zuckerberg in The Social Network Charlie Banks in The Education of Charlie Banks Columbus in Zombieland Daniel Cheston in Solitary Man J. Daniel Atlas in Now You See Me Lex Luthor in Batman v Superman: Dawn of Justice Danny Rand / Iron Fist in Iron Fist Will Stronghold in Sky High Monty Green in The 100 Stephen Hawking in The Theory of Everything Newt Scamander in Fantastic Beasts and Where to Find Them Zach Young in Desperate Housewives Evan in Superbad Paulie Bleeker in Juno Winn Schott in Supergirl Silas Botwin in Weeds Jack Unger in Underdog Eugene Felnich in Grease (2002 redub)
 Rick Riker / Dragonfly in Superhero Movie Meeker in Clockstoppers Agent Smith in J. Edgar Will Mckenzie in The Inbetweeners Adam Levi in Schindler's List Marco in What to Expect When You're Expecting Kevin Miller in Movie 43 Clay in The Kids Are All Right Stuart Twombly in The Internship Caleb Holloway in Deepwater Horizon Colin Craven in The Secret Garden Raymond in Aquamarine Jimmy Olsen in Smallville Kenny in The Last Kiss Danny Francis in Blue Jasmine Enea in Troy Lip Gallagher in Shameless Teen Ethan Montgomery in A Dog's Purpose Mason Freeland in Thirteen Jimmy Olsen in Superman Returns Linus in Fanboys Clark in The Master Valerian in Valerian and the City of a Thousand Planets Robert "Muso" Alexander III in Step Up: All In Andrew Neiman in Whiplash Nate Archibald in Gossip Girl''

References

External links
 
 
 

1981 births
Living people
Italian male child actors
Italian male film actors
Italian male television actors
Italian male video game actors
Italian male voice actors
Male actors from Rome